Jacqui Drollet (born 22 November 1944) is a French Polynesian politician, independence campaigner, and former Cabinet Minister. He was Minister of Health from 1987 to 1991, and President of the Assembly of French Polynesia from 14 April 2011 to 16 May 2013.

Drollet was educated as a marine biologist at the University of Toulouse. In 1975 he founded Ia Mana te Nunaa ("Power to the People"), a radical pro-independence party opposed to nuclear testing. He was first elected to the Assembly of French Polynesia in the 1982 French Polynesian legislative election, when Ia Mana won three seats. In August 1982 he ran in a by-election for Deputy to the French National Assembly, coming third. He was re-elected in 1986, and when Alexandre Léontieff became president in 1987, was appointed to Cabinet as Minister of Health, Environment, and Scientific Research. As Health Minister he organised a conference on the impact of French nuclear testing, and campaigned for the collection of cancer statistics so the health effects could be monitored. He lost his seat in the Assembly in the 1991 election.

He was re-elected to the Assembly on the Tavini Huiraatira list in the 1996 election, but lost his seat again in 2001. In June 2004 he was appointed vice-president in the government of Oscar Temaru. He was replaced as vice-president in October 2004 when Temaru lost a confidence vote to Gaston Flosse. He was reappointed as Vice-President when Temaru regained power in March 2005. He surrendered the position as part of a coalition realignment in April 2006. He was later appointed telecommunications and culture minister in Temaru's 2007 government, and minister of tourism in Temaru's 2009 government.

While in opposition in 2010 he introduced and passed a bill in the Assembly limiting foreign investment in telecommunications in French Polynesia, effectively thwarting a plan by mobile phone company Digicel to enter the local market.

In April 2011 he was elected President of the Assembly. In February 2012 he was found to have publicly maligned two female opposition MPs and ordered to pay each of them US$2,000. In March 2013 he established a regional grouping of Polynesian parliaments. In July 2014 when President Gaston Flosse was convicted of corruption and banned from public office he wrote an open letter to French President François Hollande urging him to apply the law and dismiss Flosse from the Presidency.

He retired from politics in 2017.

In January 1997 he was appointed a commander of the Order of Tahiti Nui.

References

1944 births
Living people
People from Papeete
University of Toulouse alumni
Tavini Huiraatira politicians
Members of the Assembly of French Polynesia
Speakers of the Assembly of French Polynesia
Government ministers of French Polynesia
Ministers of Culture of French Polynesia
Finance Ministers of French Polynesia
Health ministers of French Polynesia
Tourism ministers of French Polynesia
Commanders of the Order of Tahiti Nui